"Pleasant Valley Sunday" is a song by the Monkees, released in 1967. It was written by Gerry Goffin and Carole King. Inspired by a street named Pleasant Valley Way and their move to suburban West Orange, New Jersey, Goffin and King wrote the song about dissatisfaction with the life in the suburbs.

The Monkees' version differs somewhat from Goffin and King's demo, and their recording features a well-known guitar intro played by Michael Nesmith and a reverb ending. Micky Dolenz sang the lead. It became one of the Monkees' most successful singles, peaking at No. 3 and continuing their string of top 10 hits. The song was included on Pisces, Aquarius, Capricorn & Jones Ltd.

Writing
Cowriter Carole King stated in her autobiography that after she and her husband Gerry Goffin had earned enough money from songwriting royalties, they moved from New York City to West Orange, New Jersey. Goffin disliked their suburban life and wrote lyrics to document the feeling that became "Pleasant Valley Sunday". The lyrics are a social commentary on status symbols, creature comforts, life in suburbia and "keeping up with the Joneses".

Many alternative interpretations exist regarding the lyrics. In the book SuburbiaNation, Robert Beuka described the lyrics as "a wry commentary on the materialistic and anesthetized sensibilities of the adult generation in suburbia..." Brian Ward wrote in The 1960s: A Documentary Reader that the song was more associated with the New Left and the counterculture. Michael Nesmith jokingly stated in a 1978 interview with Blitz magazine that the song was written about "a mental institution." Deanna D. Sellnow, author of The Rhetorical Power of Popular Culture, commented that, despite so many definitions about the song's meaning, its rhetorical message is actually "bleak."

Recording 
King recorded a demo of "Pleasant Valley Sunday", later included in the 2012 compilation album The Legendary Demos, but the Monkees' version has a faster tempo and some alterations to the bridge lyrics ("Creature comfort goals/Can only numb my soul/I need a change of scenery/My thoughts all seem to stray/To places far away/I don’t ever want to see/Another Pleasant Valley Sunday…." was changed to "Creature comfort goals/They only numb my soul/And make it hard for me to see/My thoughts all seem to stray/To places far away/I need a change of scenery."). The Monkees' producer Chip Douglas, who was responsible for these changes, stated that King disapproved of them.

"Pleasant Valley Sunday" was recorded during the Pisces, Aquarius, Capricorn & Jones Ltd. sessions. The Monkees, who had been fighting to exert more control over their records, and who had recorded an album, Headquarters, on which more of the instruments were played by themselves, used more session musicians for the album tracks. The basic track for "Pleasant Valley Sunday" was recorded on June 10, 1967 with Michael Nesmith on electric guitar, Peter Tork on piano, Douglas on bass guitar and session musician Eddie Hoh on drums. Micky Dolenz was present at the session and may have played acoustic guitar. The next day, Nesmith overdubbed another electric guitar part, while Hoh recorded percussion (shaker and conga) overdubs and Bill Chadwick, a friend of the Monkees, performed a second acoustic guitar portion. The Monkees (including Davy Jones) recorded their vocals, with the possible participation of Douglas, on June 13. Nesmith played another guitar part, while Hoh overdubbed more percussion. Dolenz sang lead, with Nesmith harmonizing.

The distinctive guitar intro (and the main riff) was played by Nesmith on a black Gibson Les Paul guitar through three Vox Super Beatle amplifiers. Douglas wrote the intro based on the riff of the Beatles' "I Want to Tell You."

For the song's ending, Douglas and engineer Hank Cicalo tried to "keep pushing everything up," increasingly adding reverberation and echo until the sound became unrecognizable before fading out. Separate mono and stereo versions were mixed for single and album records.

Release and reception
Billboard described the single as a "strong, easy rocker" that is "excitingly performed."  Cash Box said that it's "an up-tempo happy-flavored ditty celebrating summertime activities that are regarded as All-American and quaint." Tork praised the vocal performances of both Dolenz and Nesmith. The single peaked at No. 3 on the Hot 100 and was repeatedly featured in the second season of their television series. The song also appeared on the fourth Monkees album, Pisces, Aquarius, Capricorn & Jones Ltd., in November 1967. While mono copies of the album included the same version heard on the single, stereo copies featured a version with a different take of the first verse and an additional backing vocal during the break. A different stereo mix, more closely replicating the single version, appeared on the 1991 Monkees box set Listen to the Band.

In February 1986, MTV aired a marathon of episodes of The Monkees titled Pleasant Valley Sunday, which sparked a second wave of interest in the band. Dolenz, Tork and Jones, already on tour, went from playing small venues to arenas and stadiums in the following weeks.

The B-side of the "Pleasant Valley Sunday" single, "Words", was written by Boyce and Hart. On the Pisces album, the song is introduced by Tork's brief spoken-word track "Peter Percival Patterson's Pet Pig Porky."

Personnel
Credits from Andrew Sandoval.
 Micky Dolenz – lead vocals, possible acoustic guitar
 Michael Nesmith – harmony vocals, electric guitar
 Peter Tork – piano, backing vocals
Davy Jones – backing vocals

Session musicians and production staff 
 Bill Chadwick – acoustic guitar
 Chip Douglas – possible vocals, bass guitar, producer
 "Fast" Eddie Hoh – drums, percussion
Hank Cicalo – engineer

Chart performance

Weekly charts

Year-end charts

In popular culture
 Grand Funk Railroad's 1970 song "I'm Your Captain (Closer to Home)" opens with a guitar intro played by Mark Farner that borrows directly from "Pleasant Valley Sunday's" guitar hook.
 The pop punk band The Mr. T Experience covered the song on their 1986 debut album Everybody's Entitled to Their Own Opinion.
 The Wedding Present covered the song on their 1992 album Hit Parade 1.
 The Christian band Code of Ethics covered the song on their 1995 album Arms Around the World.
 Mark Mothersbaugh covered the song for the theme song of the 2002 TV series Hidden Hills.
 In the 2005 Gilmore Girls season 5 episode "To Live and Let Diorama", the song is heard playing at the music store owned by Sophie Bloom (a character played by Carole King, who co-wrote the song).
 Neal Morse, lead singer of Transatlantic, and former lead singer of Spock's Beard, covered the song on his 2006 album Cover to Cover.
 In the 2008 Family Guy season 6 episode "McStroke", this song plays in the background during a classic hallway chase scene.
 Jazz singer Kurt Elling covered the song on his 2012 album 1619 Broadway – The Brill Building Project.
 The song is performed in Act II of the 2013 jukebox musical Beautiful: The Carole King Musical.

References

Further reading

External links
 Pleasant Valley Way map

1967 singles
The Monkees songs
Songs with lyrics by Gerry Goffin
West Orange, New Jersey
Songs written by Carole King
Magnapop songs
1986 in American television
MTV original programming
1967 songs
Satirical songs
Works about suburbs
American psychedelic rock songs